The Orto Botanico dell'Università di Trieste (4.2 hectares) is a nature preserve and botanical garden operated by the University of Trieste, Friuli-Venezia Giulia, northern Italy.

The garden was established in 1963 on the grounds of Villa Valerio, a chocolate baron's former estate, shortly after it became university property. In 1968 two small greenhouses were added. The garden's most recent catalog was published in 1990; since then the garden has not been fully maintained.

At present, about 1 hectare is planted with specimens including Aesculus hippocastanum, Laurus nobilis, Prunus avium, and Sambucus nigra, as well as Helleborus, Polypodium, Seseli, and Valeriana. The remaining area is kept in a natural state; species include Carpinus orientalis, Centaurea forojuliensis, Pinus nigra, Quercus petraea, Quercus pubescens, as well as Dianthus tergestinus, Euphorbia characias wulfenii, Potentilla tommasiniana, Ruscus aculeatus, etc. One greenhouse contains a collection of about 80 species of succulent plants including Aizoaceae, Cactaceae, Crassulaceae, and Euphorbiaceae; the other is devoted to species of temperate climates.

See also 
 List of botanical gardens in Italy

References 
 Orto Botanico dell'Università di Trieste (Italian)
 Horti entry (Italian)

Buildings and structures in Trieste
Botanical gardens in Italy
Gardens in Friuli-Venezia Giulia